Silencer is an original novel written by David Bishop and based on the long-running British science fiction comic strip Judge Dredd. It is Bishop's third Judge Dredd novel. At the time of publication (1994) Bishop was editor of the Judge Dredd Megazine.

Synopsis

Dredd is assigned to Sector 66 to investigate the murder of its sector chief. A mysterious creature with the power of invisibility is killing people throughout the sector. Meanwhile, Chief Judge McGruder is losing her mind.

Continuity

Silencer was set during the events depicted in the stories Conspiracy of Silence in 2000 AD #891–894 and Prologue in the Judge Dredd Megazine (vol. 2 #57), which were both prequels to the epic-length story Wilderlands, published in both comics.

External links
Silencer at the 2000 AD website.

Novels by David Bishop
Judge Dredd novels